Adrian Hădean (born 4 September 1977, Arad) is a Romanian „chef”. He grew up in Baia Mare, a city in northern Romania, where he also made his debut as a professional cook. Today, he is a well-renowned Romanian chef, gastronomer, food  blogger, writer, and public personality. He is particularly famous for his culinary blog, one of the most visited in Romania, as well as for his participation as a member of the jury in the cooking show MasterChef, which debuted in 2014 on one of the Romanian TV stations.

Adrian Hădean's culinary experience began in 1998 when he entered the realm of professional cuisine.

He hosted a series of TV shows, published books or contributed to publishing them, adding his knowledge to culinary terminology. He has become famous via the numerous projects he participated in over time.

Shows 
He hosted a series of culinary shows such as Sare şi Piper at a local station in Baia Mare and Happy Cook in Oradea, followed by a show directed by Rețete fără secrete for local stations like Antena 1, also various films for Euforia TV, as well as some television collaborations for the show Sarea în bucate, produced in Cluj, for TVR 3.

In 2014, he joined the jury of the MasterChef Romania show. The format of the show consists in a cooking competition for amateurs and is the Romanian version of the British-inspired television show, MasterChef, in its fourth season.

In 2016, he begins his collaboration with Europa FM a national radio station, for the Medium Rare show, a journey into the culinary world nowadays.

Furthermore, in 2016, he launches the #outofthekitchen project that is a unique online show, aiming to show how people are living their lives outside the kitchen.

2020 marks the beginning of his collaboration with Digi24 for the show "La Cină", together with Ionela Năstase. The television production has a premium format, in which the show's hosts are discussing with the people of the moment about current issues, in a warm, welcoming atmosphere.

Publications 
In 2003, Adrian Hădean published his first book, “Sare și piper” (Salt and Pepper), inspired by the name of his debut show on a local Baia Mare TV station, followed in 2012 by a second book, “Rețete pentru un Crăciun în familie” (Recipes for a Family-Style Christmas).

He contributed toward culinary education with several books translated and edited in Romanian: "1000 Rețete. Deserturi" (1000 Recipes: Desserts), "1000 Rețete. Preparate rapide" (1000 Recipes: Quick Meals) and "Rețete delicioase pentru prepararea pâinii" (Delicious Recipes for Making Bread).

In 2016, Adrian Hădean published the book "24 Centimetri". His book, partly an autobiography, partly a manifesto for tasty  food and genuine people, answering many questions that his admirers ask themselves. Hădean writes about his beginnings, about the secrets of running a restaurant, about the  meals, television shows and a series of tips and tricks about cooking and lifestyle.

Projects 
He developed a partnership with local authorities in Cluj-Napoca, in the project "Farfurii curate" which aimed to bring healthy meals in 3 state kindergartens in Cluj-Napoca.

Starting with 2014, he takes on the role of judge on the Masterchef show, a show with a culinary profile, broadcast by Pro TV.

He is a specialist consultant for various restaurants, culinary businesses in the country and also a member of the Arena Bucătarilor jury, a competition organized by Selgros for professional chefs.

He was elected to carry the Olympic Torch at Ramsgate, Kent County on a 300-meter stretch, following the national project "Local Heroes" which was launched by Samsung, the sponsor of the 2012 London Olympics.

In 2015, he founded the Adi Hădean Association having as main purpose  promoting projects that are meant to bring forth the Romanian cuisine, as well as various actions in the culinary and social field. Școala de bucătari is the first project developed  by the “Adi Hădean” Association, through which, annually, youngsters passionate about cooking, but with limited financial possibilities, can take specialized classes in cooking, thus increasing their chances of employment in domain.

In addition, in 2015 he has launched the #EatThis campaign, a campaign meant to ban smoking in places where food is served, under the slogan "Do not smoke where you eat, do not eat where you smoke". The campaign challenged restaurants to adopt A Smoke-Free Day and joined already existent initiatives in Romania, that advocated for banning smoking in public spaces and that ultimately materialised in passing on the bill that prohibits smoking in Romania as well.

In 2016, Hădean begins the collaboration with San Pellegrino, one of the brands with the best affiliation to the worlds gastronomic phenomenon, in order to be part of the jury of the San Pellegrino Young Chef competition 2016 edition. In this edition, Adrian Hădean has the role of mentor for the winner of the regional stage, which will participate in the world final in Italy, in autumn 2016.

He launches the Hadean.Live project, a blog about lifestyle, a platform that brings together thoughts and ideas as well as pictures and videos.

He managed to stand out not only through his talent and passion for what he does, but also through his creative ideas and implication in social causes. Thus, through the #hadeanrun project, he runs marathons and half marathons every year to raise money and support social causes. Only for the Hope and Homes for children association, Adrian Hădean has already run in five competitions in the past years.

April 2020 begins with the launching of the Adi Hădean Association Solidar Social project. The humanitarian action was initiated together with the Direcția Generală de Asistență Socială și Protecția Copilului Sector 6, as a solution to the crisis caused by the Covid-19 pandemic. In one year of existence, the team of chefs, led by Adi Hădean, together with volunteers and with the support of sponsors, prepared 200,000 warm meals for the medical staff at the forefront of the fight against Covid-19 and for people affected by poverty. The purpose of the project is to provide warm meals for the less fortunate, hungry children or the elderly who would not otherwise be able to afford something of the sorts.

The Association's main goal is to prepare and / or deliver over 1 million portions annually and to develop five social canteens. Six months after its establishment, in October 2020, the “Solidar Social” team validated a partnership with the Organizația Salvați Copiii, to provide food for the 100 children that live in the Centrul de Zi din Petrila, Hunedoara County, Constanța and Ploiești followed, where social canteens will annually prepare 33,600 portions of warm meals for the people from disadvantaged categories. In March, the Adi Hădean Association and the CONCORDIA School of Trades launched the “Chef de excelență” project, in which the association's leaders will organize monthly professional training for students enrolled in this specialization.

Prizes 
He won various prizes and cups, set culinary records by making a skewer with the length of 101 meters, fried on a brick oven with embers of the same length.

In 2015, the Men's Health publication awarded him the Men of the Year 2015 trophy as a token of appreciation for the entire activity.

Also in 2015, he was awarded by the prestigious Forbes Romania publication, during the Forbes Heroes Gala, an event that promotes the true heroes and models of Romania.

For the EatThis campaign, he was awarded with a diploma of excellence from the US Embassy in Romania at the conference on the passing on the bill against smoking in public places.

In 2017 and 2019, Adrian Hădean won for the “Best Chef” category, within the Horeca Awards, an event with solid notoriety in this field.

In 2020, “Solidar Social”, the humanitarian campaign of the Adi Hădean Association, was awarded with the first prize in the category “Best CSR Campaign 2020” within the Horeca Awards event.

In 2021, Adi Hădean won first prize for the “Economic and social development” category, within the 19th edition of the Civil Society Gala. He was also awarded with the first prize in the category „Best Social Good Campaigns”, within Webstock 2021.

References 

Romanian chefs
Romanian bloggers
1977 births
Living people